The Puente de Añasco, also called Puente Salcedo, is a bridge spanning between Añasco, Puerto Rico and Mayagüez, Puerto Rico.  It was listed on the National Register of Historic Places in 2011. It is located at Kilometer 146.1 of Highway 2.

It spans the boundary between the Añasco Arriba barrio in the municipality of Añasco and the Sabanetas barrio in the municipality of Mayagüez. The bridge bears a striking similarity to the Puente de Trujillo Alto, another Pennsylvania through truss bridge built during 1939–1941 in the Trujillo Alto municipality of Puerto Rico.

It may be Bridge No. 75 described in a review of historic bridges in Puerto Rico, which is a single span Pennsylvania through truss railroad bridge built over the Añasco River in 1944.

References

External links
 

Añasco, Puerto Rico
Road bridges on the National Register of Historic Places in Puerto Rico
National Register of Historic Places in Mayagüez, Puerto Rico
Pennsylvania truss bridges
1944 establishments in Puerto Rico
Bridges completed in 1944